Hainesburg is an unincorporated community and census-designated place (CDP) located within Knowlton Township in Warren County, New Jersey, United States. While the community has existed for over a century, the CDP was designated as part of the 2010 United States Census. As of the 2010 Census, the CDP's population was 91.

History
Hainesburg is located next to Paulins Kill, and a stone grist mill was erected on that waterway prior to the American Revolution.  The mill was destroyed by fire in 1908.

A tannery was built in 1840 by Jacob Hibler.

Land was acquired at Hainesburg in 1843 by the Beck brothers, who divided it into lots.  Originally known as "Sodom", the town's first post office was called "Hainesburg" in honor of John Haines, who made a significant donation to a school located there.

A saw mill was built by George Adams in 1881, and a station on the New York, Susquehanna and Western Railway was located in Hainesburg.

Geography
According to the United States Census Bureau, the CDP had a total area of 0.156 square miles (0.405 km2), including 0.155 square miles (0.402 km2) of land and 0.001 square miles (0.003 km2) of water (0.84%).

Demographics

Census 2000
As of the 2000 United States Census, the population for ZIP Code Tabulation Area 07833 was 159.

Census 2010

References

External links

 

Census-designated places in Warren County, New Jersey
Knowlton Township, New Jersey